The Islas del Ibicuy Department (in Spanish, Departamento Islas del Ibicuy) is an administrative subdivision (departamento) of the province of Entre Ríos, Argentina. It is the ninth largest in the province with 4,500 km2 and the least populated, with 12,077 inhabitants according to the 2010 census.

Localities
Ceibas
Médanos, Entre Ríos
Ñancay
Puerto Ibicuy
Villa Paranacito

References

Departments of Entre Ríos Province